Hims & Hers Health, Inc. is an American telehealth company that sells prescription and over-the-counter drugs online, as well as personal care products. Founded in 2017, it reached a valuation of $1.6 billion after closing a deal with Oaktree Capital Management to go public.

History 
In 2017, Andrew Dudum founded Hims Inc. with Jack Abraham and Hilary Coles out of the Atomic Labs portfolio. Hims initially sold erectile dysfunction treatment sildenafil and hair loss treatments such as minoxidil, biotin vitamins and DHT-blocking shampoo.

In late 2018, Hims launched Hers, a brand targeted to women, selling birth control pills and flibanserin.

In January 2019, Hims raised $100 million in a Series C funding round with a pre-money valuation of $1 billion. In the same month, Hims was launched in the United Kingdom with a catalogue limited by European regulation.

In April 2020, Hims launched mental health services, including anonymous group therapy. In January, 2023 the company announced their partnership with actress Kristen Bell as their first ever Mental Health Ambassador. Together, they've announced their goal of working together to combat stigma surrounding mental health and encourage conversation and exploration of treatment for people struggling with anxiety and depression.

In October 2020, Hims closed a deal with Oaktree Capital Management to go public through a blank check company, reaching a valuation of $1.6 billion. As part of the deal, the company was renamed Hims & Hers Health Inc. The transaction was completed in January 2021, and the company started trading publicly on the New York Stock Exchange.

Prescription process 
Hims and Hers offers online consultations to get prescriptions. The platform connects clients to doctors who prescribe the drugs based on an online intake form and photographs.

References

External links 
 forhims.com
 forhers.com

Companies based in San Francisco
Personal care brands
Online retailers of the United States
2017 establishments in California
Companies listed on the New York Stock Exchange
Special-purpose acquisition companies
Online pharmacies